Opened Shutters is a 1921 American silent drama film directed by William Worthington and starring Edith Roberts, Josef Swickard and Joseph Singleton. It is a remake of the 1914 film The Opened Shutters, based on a novel by Clara Louise Burnham.

Cast
 Edith Roberts as Sylvia Lacey
 Josef Swickard as Sam Lacey 
 Joseph Singleton as 	Nat Morris 
 Mai Wells as 	Martha Lacey
 Clark Comstock as Judge Calvin Trent
 Edmund Burns as John Dunham 
 Charles Clary as Jacob Johnson
 Floyce Brown as Mrs. Lem Foster
 Nola Luxford as Edna Derwent
 Andrew Waldron as Captain Lem Foster
 Lorraine Weiler as Minty

References

Bibliography
 Connelly, Robert B. The Silents: Silent Feature Films, 1910-36, Volume 40, Issue 2. December Press, 1998.

External links
 

1921 films
1921 drama films
1920s English-language films
American silent feature films
Silent American drama films
American black-and-white films
Universal Pictures films
Films directed by William Worthington
1920s American films